Tinutuan, also known as bubur manado or Manadonese porridge is a specialty of the Manado cuisine and a popular breakfast food in the city of Manado and the surrounding province of North Sulawesi, Indonesia.
Tinutuan is a congee made from rice, pumpkin and sweet potato or cassava cooked up into a pulp, which is then mixed with corn kernels and various leafy vegetables such as kangkung (water spinach), kemangi (lemon basil), melinjo (Gnetum gnemon), and bayam (amaranth).
Finally it is served with many toppings that may include fried shallots, fried tofu, spring onions, leeks, coriander, chili, condiments like sambal and dabu-dabu, and smoked or salted fish, usually skipjack tuna, anchovies, or nike (a small species of fish from nearby Lake Tondano).

The etymology of the word tinutuan is unknown. The exact date when tinutuan was invented is also uncertain. Some sources say it has been popular since 1970, while others date its invention as late as 1981.
The local government of Manado made tinutuan an official icon of the city in 2005
and assigned a "traditional food area" lined with tinutuan stalls at Wakeke Street.

At its place of origin, Manado, tinutuan usually served with cakalang fufu (smoked skipjack tuna), shrimp paste or smoked garfish sambal, or meatballs.

Tinutuan with noodles is called miedal or midal.

Gallery

See also

 List of porridges

References

External links 

Porridges
Indonesian rice dishes
Manado cuisine